First-seeded Roy Emerson defeated Ken Fletcher 6–3, 6–3, 6–1 in the final to win the men's singles tennis title at the 1963 Australian Championships.

Seeds
The seeded players are listed below. Roy Emerson is the champion; others show the round in which they were eliminated.

 Roy Emerson (champion)
 Ken Fletcher (finalist)
 Bob Hewitt (semifinals)
 Fred Stolle (semifinals)
 Martin Mulligan (third round)
 John Newcombe (quarterfinals)
 John Fraser (quarterfinals)
 Bob Howe (quarterfinals)

Draw

Key
 Q = Qualifier
 WC = Wild card
 LL = Lucky loser
 r = Retired

Finals

Earlier rounds

Section 1

Section 2

Section 3

Section 4

External links
 1963 Australian Championships on ITFtennis.com, the source for this draw

1963 in tennis
1963
1963 in Australian tennis